Camera Obscura is a 2000 crime film. The film was directed by Hamlet Sarkissian. It stars Adam Trese, Ariadna Gil, Cully Fredricksen, VJ Foster, Molly Bryant and Kirk Ward.

References

External links 
 

2000 films
2000 crime drama films
American crime drama films
2000s English-language films
2000s American films